The 2006–07 Honduran Liga Nacional was the 42nd edition of the Honduran top division. C.D. Motagua and Real C.D. España won the Apertura and Clausura tournaments respectively.

2006–07 teams

Atlético Olanchano (Catacamas) (promoted)
Broncos UNAH (Choluteca)
Hispano (Comayagua)
Marathón (San Pedro Sula)
Motagua (Tegucigalpa)
Olimpia (Tegucigalpa)
Platense (Puerto Cortés)
Real España (San Pedro Sula)
Victoria (La Ceiba)
Vida (La Ceiba)

Apertura
The Apertura tournament for the 2006–07 season started on 12 August 2006 with the 2–1 Club Deportivo Olimpia's away victory over C.D. Victoria at the Estadio Nilmo Edwards. C.D. Motagua as Apertura winners qualified to the 2007 UNCAF Interclub Cup.

Regular season

Standings

Results
 As of 26 November 2006

Final round

Semifinals

Olimpia vs Marathón

 Olimpia won 3–2 on aggregate score.

Motagua vs Hispano

 Motagua won 6–2 on aggregate score.

Final

Olimpia vs Motagua

 Motagua won 4–2 on aggregate score.

Awards
 Champion:MotaguaAwarded 360,000 Lempiras
 Sub Champion:OlimpiaAwarded 155,000 Lempiras
 Fair Play:Broncos UNAHAwarded 50,000 Lempiras
 Top Goal Scorer:Carlo CostlyAwarded 30,000 Lempiras
 Best Goalkeeper:Ricardo CanalesAwarded 30,000 Lempiras
 Most Valuable Player:
Awarded 30,000 Lempiras

 Rookie of the year:Henry BermúdezAwarded 30,000 Lempiras

Records
 Highest fee paid:Motagua–Olimpia17 DecemberEstadio Olimpico, San Pedro Sula38,256 fans4,528,020 lempiras
 Highest Assistance:Motagua–Olimpia17 DecemberEstadio Olimpico, San Pedro Sula38,256 fans4,528,020 lempiras
 Lowest fee paid:
 Lowest Assistance:

Top goalscorers

 As of 17 December 2006

Clausura
Honduras Clausura 2006-07 is the closing season of Liga Nacional de Honduras, the first division national football league in Honduras. It followed the 2006–07 Honduras Apertura season. This is tournament # 50 of  Liga Nacional de Honduras. The winner qualified for the 2007 UNCAF Club Tournament. It started January 13 and ended on 19 May.

Regular season

Standings

Results
 As of 29 April 2007

Final round

Semifinals

Real España vs Motagua

 Real España won 4–1 on aggregate score.

Marathón vs Olimpia

 Marathón 2–2 Olimpia on aggregate score; Marathón won 3–0 on penalty shootouts.

Final

Real España vs Marathón

 Real España won 4–3 on aggregate score.

Top goalscorers

 As of 19 May 2007

Awards
Champion:Real EspañaAwarded 360,000 Lempiras
Runner Up:MarathónAwarded 155,000 Lempiras
Fair Play:Atlético OlanchanoAwarded 50,000 Lempiras
Top Goal Scorer:Carlos PavónAwarded 30,000 Lempiras
Best Goalkeeper:Orlin VallecilloAwarded 30,000 Lempiras
Most Valuable Player:Carlos PavónAwarded 30,000 Lempiras
Rookie of the year:Henry BermúdezAwarded 30,000 Lempiras

Relegation table

Promoted team
This team was promoted from Honduran Liga Nacional de Ascenso for the next season:
Deportes Savio (second time in the top flight)

Trivia
The final is the second final with a clasico sampedrano, 26 years after the first.
After seven consecutive finals, Olimpia did not participate in this tournament's final.
 This is tournament # 50 of  Liga Nacional de Fútbol de Honduras.

References

Liga Nacional de Fútbol Profesional de Honduras seasons
1
Honduras